Brandon McDonald may refer to:

 Brandon McDonald (gridiron football) (born 1985), American football cornerback 
 Brandon McDonald (soccer) (born 1986), American soccer player